Santo Domingo Church and Monastery is a ruined monastery in Antigua Guatemala, Guatemala. Its history can be traced back to 1538 when the Dominicans arrived in Guatemala. It had two towers with ten bells and the monastery was filled with treasures. The monastery was destroyed in the 1773 Santa Marta earthquake. Today, part of the ruins have been transformed into a hotel, the Hotel Casa Santo Domingo.

References

Further reading

 
 
 
 

Roman Catholic monasteries in Guatemala
Roman Catholic churches in Antigua Guatemala
Buildings and structures demolished in the 1770s